Maurilio Castillo (born 1 December 1962) is a Mexican male former long-distance runner who specialised in the marathon. He represented his country at the 1991 World Championships in Athletics and finished seventh there. He holds a personal best of 2:10:47 hours set when he finished third at the Tokyo International Marathon. He was the 1992 winner at the Central American and Caribbean Cross Country Championships. Castillo also competed at the 1995 Pan American Games.

On the professional circuit he was the winner at the Twin Cities Marathon in 1990 and the Beppu-Ōita Marathon in 1993. He had top three finishes at the Turin Marathon, Amsterdam Marathon, Barcelona Marathon and San Diego Marathon. He also finished in the top ten at the 1995 Chicago Marathon, 1993 Beijing Marathon, 1992 London Marathon and 1991 Rotterdam Marathon.

International competitions

References

External links

Living people
1962 births
Mexican male long-distance runners
Mexican male cross country runners
Mexican male marathon runners
World Athletics Championships athletes for Mexico
Pan American Games competitors for Mexico
Athletes (track and field) at the 1995 Pan American Games
20th-century Mexican people